Simrad Yachting is a manufacturer of marine electronics for the leisure and professional markets. A member of the Navico family of brands, Simrad Yachting develops, manufactures and distributes navigation systems, autopilots, marine VHF radios, chartplotters, echosounders, radars, fishfinders and a wide range of other marine technology.

History 

The Simrad name has been in existence for over sixty years. The brand was established in 1947 by Willy Christian Simonsen, who set up his own wireless company called Simonsen Radio. Initially he focused on the production of radio communications for fishing vessels but a few years later coined the name Simrad to encompass a wider range of activities – namely the design and manufacture of navigation, communication, auto-steering and fish-finding technologies.

In 1996 the Simrad Group was purchased by the Kongsberg Group which, following a decision to focus on the industrial market, sold on the Simrad recreational product range to Altor Equity Partners in 2005, creating Simrad Yachting.  Simrad Group and Simrad Yachting are therefore now entirely independent of each other, with separate owners and distinct product specialisations.  It was the merger of Simrad Yachting and Lowrance Inc in 2006 that went on to create the Navico Group, now the largest leisure marine electronics manufacturer in the world.

Product range 

Simrad Yachting produces a range of navigation instruments designed to withstand challenging conditions and provide navigation solutions for both leisure boaters (via the Simrad Yachting range) and coastal mariners (via the Simrad Professional range).  In 2008 the company absorbed MX Marine – acquired as a result of the takeover by Navico of the marine electronics division of Brunswick New Technologies Inc in 2007 – into its Simrad Professional line-up, further extending its position in the commercial GPS and DGPS sector.

See also 
 Navico, parent company of Simrad
 B&G, another subsidiary of Navico, which focuses on the sailing market
 Lowrance Electronics, another subsidiary of Navico

References

External links 
 Simrad Yachtings official website
 Simrad Commercial official website

Marine electronics
Norwegian brands